Stenomphalia is a genus of gastropods belonging to the family Hygromiidae.

The species of this genus are found in Central Asia.

Species:

Stenomphalia selecta 
Stenomphalia turcica

References

Gastropods